North Township is one of the fifteen townships of Harrison County, Ohio, United States. As of the 2010 census the population was 1,717, of whom 954 lived in the unincorporated portion of the township.

Geography
Located in the northern part of the county, it borders the following townships:
Perry Township, Carroll County - north
Rumley Township - east
Archer Township - southeast
Stock Township - south
Monroe Township - west

The village of Scio is located in central North Township.

Name and history
It is the only North Township statewide.

Government
The township is governed by a three-member board of trustees, who are elected in November of odd-numbered years to a four-year term beginning on the following January 1. Two are elected in the year after the presidential election and one is elected in the year before it. There is also an elected township fiscal officer, who serves a four-year term beginning on April 1 of the year after the election, which is held in November of the year before the presidential election. Vacancies in the fiscal officership or on the board of trustees are filled by the remaining trustees.

References

External links
County website

Townships in Harrison County, Ohio
Townships in Ohio